is a 1969 Japanese yakuza film directed by Kinji Fukasaku.

Plot
The Danno Organization, Japan's largest yakuza clan, expands outward from its base in Osaka during the post-war period under the leadership of Boss Danno and Chief Executive Tsubaki, the family's ruthless captain. In Yokohama, the boss of the Hamanaka Family pledges fealty to the Danno Organization. In order to block Boss Danno's progress, the yakuza families of Tokyo form the Tokyo Alliance, appointing Boss Yato as chairman. The Alliance uses the Sakurada Family, the dominant family in Yokohama, to attack the Hamanaka Family in a proxy war between their forces and those of the Danno Organization.

Hamanaka's right-hand man, Tetsuo Tsukamoto, is released after spending eight years in prison and learns that his wife committed suicide. Shortly thereafter, the boss of the Hamanaka family is killed by explosives thrown by hitmen from the Sakurada Family. With his dying breath, he passes control of the gang to Tsukamoto, urging him to reject the Danno Organization and fight to keep them out of Yokohama. A funeral is organized, with both Chairman Yato and Boss Danno visiting to pay their respects. Kamiyama, the retired boss of the Hamanaka, offers to help Tsukamoto as an unofficial advisor.

Tsukamoto wishes to call a truce with the Sakurada Family and end his family's oath to Boss Danno, but decides to kill Boss Sakurada in order to appease his men's desire for vengeance. A senior Hamanaka officer, Kazama, is unwilling to let Tsukamoto return to jail after just getting out, so he murders Boss Sakurada himself, returning home mortally wounded and dying from his injuries. Tsubaki tries to convince Tsukamoto to remain with the Danno Organization and Danno himself warns Tsukamoto that he could wind up "dead in the gutter" for opposing him. Meanwhile, Kazama's sister is left with no one to care for her, so Tsukamoto tells her she can ask anything of him.

The Hokuryu Kai, a gang led by the drug-addicted Miyahara, is expelled from the Tokyo Alliance for showing disrespect and violating the yakuza code. Tsubaki convinces them to swear loyalty to Boss Danno and sends them against the Sakurada Family, resulting in many Sakurada members getting killed and a Hamanaka man, Taki, being taken hostage by the Hokuryu when he tries to intervene in a fight at a local nightclub. Tsukamoto is ordered to come alone if he wants to save him. Tsukamoto arrives at the club and discovers Kazama's sister working as a singer. In a back room, he finds a badly beaten Taki being held by Miyahara and his men. Miyahara punches Tsukamoto and slashes him with a knife, but Tsukamoto refuses to fight back. Miyahara, not wanting to antagonize the entire Hamanaka Family, allows him to leave with Taki. Kazama's sister quits her job and nurses Tsukamoto back to health. They begin a relationship after realizing that they both have feelings for each other.

Chairman Yato uses Ooba, a former boss with a grudge against the Danno Organization for wiping out his family and leaving him with only one arm in a confrontation the previous year, to carry out an attack on Boss Danno. Ooba finds Danno coming out of a meeting with political kingpin Kita Bokudo and shoots him in the shoulder before taking a bullet to the chest. An American tourist behind him is also struck by gunfire. Ooba flees and is rescued by the Hamanaka Family, but Tsubaki soon finds him after seeing his wife enter the family offices. Ooba and his wife try to leave in secret, but are intercepted by Danno Organization men. Ooba is shot dead, and his wife is gunned down when she goes after his killers.

When the American tourist dies from her wound, Bokudo tells Boss Danno that, to protect his family, he must reconcile with the Tokyo Alliance and support the Japan-U.S. Security Treaty. The Tokyo Alliance agrees to the truce, but only if Danno forces the Hokuryu Kai out of Yokohama. Miyahara refuses to leave, so Danno severs all ties with him. Miyahara tells his men to leave the city until he can swear loyalty to Tsukamoto. Members of the Tokyo Alliance ambush Miyahara and kill him; Tsukamoto is arrested by the police before he can help Miyahara, allowing the Danno Organization to launch a surprise attack that leaves the Hamanaka Family decimated. The police berate Tsukamoto for his actions, blaming him for countless deaths, but ultimately release him from custody. Kazama's sister begs Tsukamoto not to retaliate and accuses him of putting the gang before her, just like her brother. Tsukamoto refuses to listen and decides to take revenge himself.

Tsubaki, disgusted by his boss' decision to reconcile with the Tokyo Alliance, notices Tsukamoto approaching the site of the ceremony and deliberately lets the boss stab him so he doesn't have to take the blame for not protecting Danno. Armed with sharp blades, Tsukamoto kills Boss Danno and Chairman Yato, while letting Bokudo live. A yakuza shoots him, and he bleeds to death, having upheld his family's honor.

Cast
Kōji Tsuruta as Tsukamoto
Tomisaburō Wakayama as Miyahara
Bunta Sugawara as Kazama
Noboru Andō as Ooba
Michitarō Mizushima
Ryōhei Uchida as Tsubaki
Sanae Nakahara as Katsuko, Ooba's wife
Seizaburō Kawazu as Yato
Asao Uchida
Rin'ichi Yamamoto
Yoshi Katō
Hideo Murota
Harumi Sone

Production
This was Fukasaku's first film about "modern yakuza" after his return to the Toei Company.

Release
The film was released in 1969. Sometimes referred to as Japan's Violent Gangs - Boss, it was the first in a series of four Nihon boryoku-dan (Japan's Violent Gangs) films. It was followed by Nihon boryoku-dan: kumicho to shikaku (Japan's Violent Gangs - The Boss and the Killers) (1969) by Junya Sato, Nihon boryoku-dan: kumicho kuzure (Japan's Violent Gangs - Degenerate Boss) (1970) by Shin Takakuwa, and Nihon boryoku-dan: koroshi no sakazuki (Japan's Violent Gangs - Loyalty Offering) (1972) by Yasuo Furuhata.

Planned sequel
Fukusaku biographer Sadao Yamane stated that the Fukasaku film Sympathy for the Underdog, a film that was released a short time later in 1971 and that also stars Tsuruta and Ando, was originally developed as a sequel to Japan Organized Crime Boss until the director saw The Battle of Algiers. According to Yamane, it was then that Fukasaku decided to make a film about "foreigners" and "resistance groups" within a yakuza film.

References

External links
 

1969 films
1960s Japanese films
1969 crime films
Japanese crime films
Films directed by Kinji Fukasaku
1960s Japanese-language films
Toei Company films
Yakuza films
Films set in Yokohama